Chelsea Field is an American actress.

Career 
Field started her career as a Solid Gold Dancer, and one of her first television roles was on Airwolf. She also played Teela in the 1987 film adaptation of Masters of the Universe. She began portraying attorney Rita Devereaux on NCIS: New Orleans during the program's third season. The character was changed from recurring to regular effective with the seventh season.

Personal life 
Field is married to actor Scott Bakula, and she has appeared on several episodes of NCIS: New Orleans, in which he stars. According to a December 2010 Tyler 'n Todd radio interview with Bakula, he and Field had been together for "16 years, almost" but married for only "a year".

Filmography

Film

Television

References

External links

 
 

Living people
20th-century American actresses
21st-century American actresses
Actresses from Glendale, California
American film actresses
American television actresses
Year of birth missing (living people)